Flubber (named from the film The Absent-Minded Professor), Glorp, Glurch, or Slime is a rubbery polymer formed by cross-linking of polyvinyl alcohol (PVA) with a borate compound. Slime can be made by combining polyvinyl-acetate-based adhesives with borax.

Reaction
The gelation process entails formation of a borate ester that crosslinks the chains of the PVA. Borate esters form readily by condensation of hydroxyl groups and the B-OH groups. 

The individual polymer chains are bound together by weak hydrogen bonds. The resulting polymer network is composed of strands of polyvinyl alcohol held together side-by-side by the borate molecules. It is evident that this cross linking is weak because of the ease with which the slime flows and pulls apart. However, even though this cross linking is weak, it does alter the properties of the resulting polymer.

Properties
Flubber is a non-Newtonian fluid that flows under low stress, but breaks under higher stresses and pressures. This combination of fluid-like and solid-like properties makes it a Maxwell fluid. Its behavior can also be described as being viscoplastic or gelatinous.

See also
Silly Putty
Gunge
Nickelodeon compounds
Slime (toy)

References

Chemistry experiments
Non-Newtonian fluids
Sensory toys